¡Salud! João Gilberto, Originator of the Bossa Nova is an album by Jon Hendricks that was recorded as a tribute to João Gilberto.

Track listing

Personnel
 Jon Hendricks – vocals
 Conte Candoli – trumpet
 Pete Candoli – trumpet
 Milt Bernhart – trombone
 Buddy Collette – flute
 Gildo Mahones – piano
 Ray Sherman – organ
 Frank Messina – accordion
 Jimmie Smith – drums

References 

Jon Hendricks albums
1963 albums
Tribute albums
Bossa nova albums
Reprise Records albums
Albums arranged by Antônio Carlos Jobim
Portuguese-language albums